HM Prison Cardiff is a Category B men's prison, located in the Adamsdown area of Cardiff, Wales. The prison is operated by His Majesty's Prison Service.

History
By 1814, the existing Cardiff Gaol  was deemed insufficient for coping with both the scale of demand and quality of building to cope with the quickly expanding industrial town, and so proposals were made to build a new county jail for Glamorgan. Construction commenced in 1827, and the new stone building located south of Crockherbtown opened at the end of 1832, capable of housing 80 prisoners, including 20 debtors.

The three Victorian wings of Cardiff Prison underwent a major refurbishment programme in 1996, and the prison’s capacity was extended by the commissioning of three new wings (C, D and E), with the number of places for life-sentenced prisoners increased also.

In 1997 Cardiff Prison was criticised for chaining sick inmates to their hospital beds after a probe into the death of one of Cardiff's prisoners. Three years later one of Cardiff's Assistant Governors was found dead after an investigation into child pornography. The manager had been arrested at the prison days earlier by detectives investigating the alleged misuse of a personal computer.

Cardiff Prison was criticised in 2001 for its cell-share policy in the wake of an inmate's death. Prison officials were advised to carry out full checks on prisoners on their arrival, to prevent violent or even fatal incidents from occurring. A year later the prison was criticised again for its poor record in dealing with drug abuse and providing decent recreation facilities for inmates.

Execution site
A total of 20 judicial executions took place at Cardiff prison. The condemned prisoners were hanged for the crime of murder. Their names, ages and dates of execution are:

 William Lacey, 29 yrs, 21 August 1900
 Eric Lange, 30 yrs, 21 December 1904
 Rhoda Wills, 44 yrs, 14 August 1907 (female)
 George Stills, 30 yrs, 13 December 1907
 Patrick Collins, 24 yrs, 30 December 1908
 Hugh McLaren, 29 yrs, 14 August 1913
 Edgar Bindon, 19 yrs, 25 March 1914
 Alec Bakerlis, 24 yrs, 10 April 1917
 Thomas Caler, 23 yrs, 14 April 1920
 Lester Hamilton, 25 yrs, 16 August 1921
 George Thomas, 26 yrs, 9 March 1926
 Edward Rowlands, 40 yrs, 27 January 1928
 Daniel Driscoll, 34 yrs, 27 January 1928
 William John Corbett, 32 yrs, 12 August 1931
 George Roberts, 29 yrs, 8 August 1940
 Howard Joseph Grossley, 37 yrs, 5 September 1945 (an AWOL Canadian soldier)
 Evan Hadyn Evans, 22 yrs, 3 February 1948
 Clifford Wills, 31 yrs, 9 December 1948
 Ajit Singh, 27 yrs, 7 May 1952
 Mahmood Mattan, 28 yrs, 3 September 1952 (conviction quashed in February 1998)

The remains of executed prisoners were buried in unmarked graves within the prison walls, as was customary. In late 2003, after capital punishment had been abolished in the UK, the remains of Corbett, Roberts, Grossley, Evans, Wills and Singh were exhumed from the prison grounds and reburied elsewhere in order to make space for the construction of a new cell block.

The remains of Mahmood Mattan (executed in 1952 but cleared of murder in 1998) had previously been exhumed from the same location for reburial in 1996. Mattan is now buried in the Muslim section of Western Cemetery, Cardiff. His tombstone bears the epitaph "Killed by Injustice". After Mattan's conviction was quashed, his widow Laura and three sons (David, Omar and Mervyn) received the sum of £725,000 in compensation from the British Government.

The prison today
Cardiff Prison accepts male adult prisoners remanded into custody who are drawn predominantly from the surrounding court catchment area of South Wales. In addition Cardiff also houses sentenced Category B and C prisoners.

Cardiff’s regime includes full-time education, employment in the prison workshops, and training courses. There is a resettlement unit that offers prisoners various offending behaviour programmes and work based courses, and a Detoxification Unit accommodating 50 prisoners.

In 1999 the actor Keith Allen played a Probation and Parole officer at the prison, in the BBC television series Jack of Hearts.

Notable former inmates
 John Straffen

References

External links

Ministry of Justice pages on HMP Cardiff
HMP Cardiff – HM Inspectorate of Prisons Reports

Adamsdown
Cardiff
1832 establishments in Wales
Cardiff